Alfred Wysocki (26 August 1873 - 3 September 1959) – Polish lawyer and diplomat in Poland. He was ambassador of Poland to Sweden (1924-1928), Germany (1931-1933) and Rome (1933-1938). In the years 1938-1939 he was a senator .

Life 
In the late nineteenth and early twentieth century he was a journalist of Gazeta Lwowska and also member of the Young Polish Bohemian in Lwów.

In 1919-1920 Polish deputation councilor and chargé d'affaires in Prague, then in Berlin. In 1922-1923 general inspector of a Polish consular office in Paris.

From 1928 to 1931 Deputy Minister of Foreign Affairs. Polish senator in 1938-1939. Stayed in Warsaw during the German occupation of Poland in the Second World War.

He was awarded the Grand Cross of the Order of Christ (1931). On November 10, 1938 Wysocki was awarded the great sash of the Order of Polonia Restituta for "outstanding achievements in government service."

References

 

1873 births
1959 deaths
People from Łańcut
People from the Kingdom of Galicia and Lodomeria
Polish Austro-Hungarians
Senators of the Second Polish Republic (1938–1939)
Ambassadors of Poland to Germany
Ambassadors of Poland to Italy
Ambassadors of Poland to Sweden
Ambassadors of Poland to Czechoslovakia
Recipients of the Order of Christ (Portugal)
Grand Crosses of the Order of Polonia Restituta